Dandi Census Town is a Census Town situated at the Palghar district of Maharashtra, India. It is located 15 kilometers away from Palghar district.

Demographics
According to the 2011 Indian Census the town has a population of 
8,942 people out of which 5,136 are males and 3,806 are females. The average human sex ratio of Dandi is 741.

Transport
Boisar railway station is located approximately 1 kilometers away from the "Dandi Census Town".

References

Cities and towns in Palghar district
Census towns in Maharashtra